Francis Allen was a German engraver who executed the frontispiece to the book Dialogus D. Urbani Regi (or Regii?), dated Lübeck, 1652.

Sources

17th-century German artists
Year of birth missing
Year of death missing
17th-century engravers
17th-century German people
German engravers